Badminton at the 2015 Indian Ocean Island Games was held at Gymnase Michel Debré, Saint-André, Réunion.

Medalists

External links
 Official website

2015 Indian Ocean Island Games events
Badminton at the Indian Ocean Island Games
2015 in badminton